The  is the nickname used by the operator of the West Japan Railway Company (JR West) to refer to the portion of the Tōkaidō Main Line (between Maibara Station and Kyoto Station) and the Hokuriku Main Line (between Maibara Station and Nagahama Station). The section, along with JR Kyoto Line and JR Kobe Line, forms a contiguous service that is the main trunk of JR West's "Urban Network" commuter rail network in the Osaka-Kobe-Kyoto Metropolitan Area.

Overview
The line is named after , which the route runs along. Line nicknames were introduced when the newly privatized JR West intended to use "familiar" names over official line names, such as Tōkaidō Main Line and Fukuchiyama Line. Biwako Line did not appear on the first list, and instead The JR Kyoto Line was to be called up to Maibara. A move in Shiga Prefecture opposed the name, claiming that the name of Kyoto Line in Shiga sounds like an auxiliary, requiring its own name in the prefecture. Biwako Line was thus made to refer to the section between Maibara and Kyoto.

The section of the name was extended to Nagahama, on the alteration of electric supply from 20 kV AC to 1,500 V DC, which enabled through operation to Kyoto and Osaka.

Although the "Biwako Line" nickname is used by the operator JR West for passenger announcements, the official status of Tōkaidō Main Line has not been changed or discussed. The counterpart for the line, Central Japan Railway Company (JR Central) uses its official name "Tōkaidō Main Line" for the section of JR West, at the connections of Kyoto and Maibara. The "Biwako Line" nickname appears in some local newspapers and real estate advertisements. Frequent passengers understand that the Biwako, JR Kyoto, JR Kobe lines are in fact one line, however, public recognition of the name is still in question, especially among non-users along the line.

Trains
Special Rapid Service (新快速):
 Trains terminate at Nagahama, Maibara and Yasu (some trains continue on Hokuriku Line to Omi-Shiotsu and Tsuruga). Stops at Nagahama, Tamura, Sakata, Maibara, Hikone, Notogawa, Omi-Hachiman, Yasu, Moriyama, Kusatsu, Minami-Kusatsu, Ishiyama, Otsu, Yamashina, and Kyoto. Continues on JR Kyoto Line to Osaka and beyond.
 Local trains (普通)
Operated as rapid service trains when running in the west of Takatsuki (Kyoto in the morning) (3 doors par car)
These local trains are mainly operated on the Biwako Line and make every stop on the line.  They terminate at Maibara and Yasu.
JR Kyoto Line local trains (4 doors par car)
JR Kyoto Line local service extends to Yasu during rush hour on weekdays.

Stations
Stations are listed from east to west. The distance of Tokyo – Maibara is 445.9 km, and that of Tokyo – Kyoto is 513.6 km.  Historically, the Tōkaidō Main Line continued from Tokyo to Kyoto and beyond, through Maibara.  In the Japanese timetable books, the distances from Tokyo are still shown in the table, although the Biwako Line's officially begins at Maibara. 

●: Trains stop.
○: Limited stop, early morning and late night only
|: Trains pass.
Local (4-door Commuter trains): JR Kyoto Line local trains
Local (3-door Suburban trains): Operated as Rapid service trains west of Takatsuki (west of Kyoto in the morning)

Rolling stock

Local
 113 series (Kusatsu – Kusatsu – Kyoto, through service with Kusatsu Line and Kosei Line)
 117 series (Kusatsu – Kusatsu – Kyoto, through service with Kusatsu Line and Kosei Line)
 125 series (Nagahama – Maibara, through service with Hokuriku Line)
 207 series (Yasu – Kusatsu – Kyoto, through service with Kosei Line) 
 221 series (through service with Kosei Line)
 223-6000 series (through service with Kosei Line)
 321 series (Yasu – Kusatsu – Kyoto, through service with Kosei Line) 
 521-0 series (Nagahama – Maibara, through service with Hokuriku Line)

Special Rapid and Local 
 223–1000 series (through service with Kusatsu Line, Kosei Line, Hokuriku Line) 
 223-2000 series (through service with Kusatsu Line, Kosei Line, Hokuriku Line)
 225-0 series (through service with Kusatsu Line, Kosei Line, Hokuriku Line)
 225-100 series (through service with Kusatsu Line, Kosei Line, Hokuriku Line)

Limited Express
 271 series (Haruka service, from Spring 2020)
 281 series (Haruka service)
 285 series (Sunrise Izumo/Sunrise Seto service, from 1998)
 681 series (Biwako Express service)
 683 series (Biwako Express service)
 KiHa 189 series (Biwako Express service, from March 2014)
 KiHa 85 series (JR Central) (Hida service)

Former
 485 series (Biwako Liner rapid service until June 2003)
 583 series (Express Kitaguni until January 2013)
 383 series (JR Central) (Limited Express Shinano until 26 March 2016)

References

External links

Lines of West Japan Railway Company
Tōkaidō Main Line
Railway lines opened in 1988
1067 mm gauge railways in Japan